George of Trebizond (1395–1486) was a Byzantine Greek philosopher, scholar, and humanist.

Life

He was born on the Greek island of Crete (then a Venetian colony known as the Kingdom of Candia), and derived his surname Trapezuntius from the fact that his ancestors were from the Byzantine Greek Trapezuntine Empire.

When he went to Italy is not certain; according to some accounts he was summoned to Venice about 1430 to act as amanuensis to Francesco Barbaro, who appears to have already made his acquaintance; according to others he did not visit Italy until the time of the Council of Florence (1438–1439).

He learned Latin from Vittorino da Feltre, and made such rapid progress that in three years he was able to teach Latin literature and rhetoric. His reputation as a teacher and a translator of Aristotle was very great, and he was selected as secretary by Pope Nicholas V, an ardent Aristotelian. The bitterness of his attacks upon Plato (in the Comparatio Aristotelis et Platonis of 1458, described by historian James Hankins as "one of the most remarkable mixtures of learning and lunacy ever penned"), which drew forth a powerful response from Bessarion (In calumniatorem Platonis, printed in 1469) and the manifestly hurried and inaccurate character of his translations of Plato, Aristotle and other classical authors, combined to ruin his fame as a scholar, and to endanger his position as a teacher of philosophy. (Pope Pius II was among the critics of George's translations.) The indignation against George on account of his first-named work was so great that he would probably have been compelled to leave Italy had not Alfonso V of Aragon given him protection at the court of Naples.

He subsequently returned to Rome, where in 1471 he published a very successful Latin grammar based on the work of another Greek grammarian of Latin, Priscian. Additionally, an earlier work on Greek rhetorical principles garnered him wide recognition, even from his former critics who admitted his brilliance and scholarship. He died in great poverty in 1486 in Rome.

His son, Andrea of Trebizond (da Trebisonda) was also a classic scholar and translator in Rome.

Works
 Rhetoricorum libri V.  A synthesis of the Rhetorica ad Herennium and the Hermogenean corpus. 
 Isagoge dialectica.
 De artificio Ciceronianae orationis pro Quinto Ligario.
 Rhetoricorum.  A translation of Aristotle's Rhetoric.

For a complete list of his numerous works, consisting of translations from Greek into Latin (Plato, Aristotle and the Fathers) and original essays in Greek (chiefly theological) and Latin (grammatical and rhetorical), see Fabricius, Bibliotheca Graeca (ed. Harles), xii.

See also
 Byzantine scholars in Renaissance

References

Further reading
 C. J. Classen, 'The rhetorical works of George of Trebizond and their debt to Cicero', Journal of the Warburg and Courtauld Institutes 56 (1993), 75–84
 Matthew DeCoursey, 'Continental European Rhetoricians, 1400–1600, and Their Influence in Renaissance England', British Rhetoricians and Logicians, 1500–1660, First Series, DLB 236, Detroit: Gale, 2001, pp. 309–43.
 Jonathan Harris, Greek Émigrés in the West, 1400–1520 (Camberley UK: Porphyrogenitus, 1995). 
 John Monfasani, George of Trebizond. A biography and a study of his rhetoric and logic, Leiden, Brill, 1976.
 John Monfasani, ed., Collectanea Trapezuntiana. Texts, Documents, and Bibliographies of George of Trebizond, Binghamton, NY: RSA, 1984.
 Lucia Calboli Montefusco, "Ciceronian and Hermogenean Influences on George of Trebizond's Rhetoricorum Libri V," Rhetorica 26.2 (2008): 139–164.
 N.G. Wilson, From Byzantium to Italy. Greek Studies in the Italian Renaissance, London, 1992. 
 Christos Ch. Kypraios,The Ideology of Hellenoturkism: From George of Trebizond to Dimitri Kitsikis -Istanbul, Bilgi University, 2015 (MA thesis, 107 pages, with maps and charts).
 G. Voigt, Die Wiederbelebung des klassischen Altertums (1893);
 Article by C. F. Behr in Ersch and Gruber's Allgemeine Enzyklopadie.
 Harris, Jonathan, 'Byzantines in Renaissance Italy', in Online Reference Book for Medieval Studies – 
 Monfasani, John (1976) George of Trebizond : a biography and a study of his rhetoric and logic Brill, Leiden, 
 Reject Aeneas, Accept Pius: Selected Letters of Aeneas Sylvius Piccolomini (Pope Pius II), ed. and tr. T. M. Izbicki, G. Christianson and P. Krey (Washington, DC, 2006), letter no. 61.
Encyclopædia Britannica, 2007 ed.

Attribution:
 

1395 births
1486 deaths
15th-century Byzantine people
15th-century Greek people
15th-century Venetian people
15th-century philosophers
Scholars from Crete
Byzantine philosophers
Kingdom of Candia
Greek Renaissance humanists
Greek–Latin translators
Italian people of Greek descent
Amanuenses
15th-century Venetian writers
15th-century Greek writers
15th-century Greek educators